The 1912 German football championship, the 10th edition of the competition, was won by Holstein Kiel, defeating Karlsruher FV 1–0 in the final.

It was Kiel's sole German championship win, previously having made a losing appearance in the 1910 final. Holstein Kiel made one more final appearance, in 1930, where it lost to Hertha BSC. For Karlsruher FV it was the last final appearance for the club, having previously defeated Kiel in the 1910 final and lost the 1905 one to Union 92 Berlin.

Karlsruhe's Fritz Förderer was the top scorer of the 1912 championship with six goals.

Eight clubs qualified for the competition played in knock-out format, the champions of each of the seven regional football championships as well as the defending German champions.

Qualified teams
The teams qualified through the regional championships:

Competition

Quarter-finals
The quarter-finals, played on 5 and 12 May 1912:

|}

Semi-finals
The semi-finals, played on 19 May 1912:

|}

Final

References

Sources
 kicker Allmanach 1990, by kicker, page 160 to 178 – German championship
 Süddeutschlands Fussballgeschichte in Tabellenform 1897-1988  History of Southern German football in tables, publisher & author: Ludolf Hyll

External links
 German Championship 1911–12 at weltfussball.de 
 German Championship 1912 at RSSSF

German football championship seasons
1
German